Puentenansa is a village located in Cantabria in Spain. The town has 204 inhabitants. It is the capital of Rionansa municipality.

Populated places in Cantabria